Shane Abbess is an Australian filmmaker best known for making the movies Gabriel and Infini.

For a time he was attached to direct Source Code and The Dark Crystal 2.

Filmography
Gabriel (2007) – writer, producer, director
Infini (2015) – writer, producer, director
Terminus (2015) – executive producer
The Osiris Child: Science Fiction Volume One (2016) – writer, director

References

External links

Australian film producers
Australian film directors
Australian screenwriters
Living people
Year of birth missing (living people)